This is a list of venues used for professional baseball in St. Louis, Missouri. The information is a compilation of the information contained in the references listed.

Sportsman's Park
Chronology of names:
St. Louis Base Ball Park, 1868-1874
Grand Avenue Park, 1874-1881
Sportsman's Park, 1881-1893
Old Sportsman's Park, 1893-1898
Athletic Park, 1898-1902
Sportsman's Park, 1902-1953
Busch Stadium (I), 1953-1966
Old Busch Stadium, 1966
Home of:
St. Louis Brown Stockings – National Association (1875) and National League (1876–1877)
St. Louis Browns – American Association (1882–1891) and as St. Louis Cardinals – NL (mid-1920 to mid-1966)
St. Louis Whites – Western Association (1888 part season)
St. Louis Browns – American League (1902–1953)
Location: 2911 North Grand Boulevard (east); 3623 Dodier Street (south), Spring Street (west), Sullivan Avenue (north)
Infield: Southeast corner (originally); Northwest corner (1902); Southwest corner (1909)
Currently: Herbert Hoover Boys' Club

Red Stocking Park a.k.a. Compton Park
Home of:
St. Louis Reds – National Association (1875)
St. Louis Whites – Western Association (1888 part season)
Location: South Compton Avenue (east, first base); railroad tracks and Chouteau Avenue (south, third base); Edwin Street and Theresa Avenue (west, left field); Spruce Street (north, right field); Scott Avenue and Gratiot Street T-ing into Compton from the east
Currently: MetroLink system repair shops – a few blocks south/southeast of the sites of Handlan's Park and Stars Park

Union Base Ball Park a.k.a. Lucas Park
Home of: St. Louis Maroons – Union Association (1884) / National League (1885–1886)
Location: Jefferson Avenue (west, first base); Howard Street (north, third base); 25th Street (east, left field); Cass Avenue (south, right field)
Currently: Industrial

Brotherhood Park
Home of: local St. Louis clubs and guest clubs from Players' League (1890)
Location: Russell Boulevard (north); Missouri Avenue (east); Jefferson Avenue (west)
Currently: residences and Jefferson Animal Hospital

Robison Field a.k.a. New Sportsman's Park, League Park, Cardinal Field
Home of: St. Louis Browns – renamed Cardinals – National League (1892 to mid-1920)
Location: 3852 Natural Bridge Avenue (north, third base); Vandeventer Avenue (west, first base); Prairie Avenue (east, left field); Lexington Avenue (south, right field) – a few blocks north-northwest of Sportsman's Park
Currently: Beaumont High School

St. Louis University Park
Chronology of names:
St. Louis University Park, 1910-1915
High School Field, 1915-1919
Old High School Field, 1919-1922
Opened: 1910
Closed: 1922
Home of:
St. Louis Terriers - Federal League (1913 - classified as independent minor league)
Location: Oakland Avenue, west of Kingshighway Boulevard
Currently: site of St. Louis University High School

Handlan's Park
Chronology of names:
Handlan's Park, 1899-1914
Federal League Park, 1914-1917
Handlan's Park, 1917-1919
High School Field, 1919-1924
St. Louis University Field, 1924-1928
Handlan's Park, 1928-1929
Opened: 1899
Closed: 1929
Home of:
St. Louis Terriers – Federal League (1914–1915)
St. Louis Giants (1920–1921 some games) and St. Louis Stars (1920s some games) – Negro National League 
Location: Grand Avenue (west, first base); Laclede Avenue (north, third base); Theresa Avenue (east, left field) (approximates Grand Forest Drive); Clark Avenue (south, right field); Market Street (farther south)
Currently: buildings on campus of St. Louis University, and cut through by Forest Park Avenue ramps to and from I-64

Kuebler's Park or Giants Park (I)
Home of: St. Louis Giants – Negro Leagues (ca.1906–1919)
Location: Prescott Avenue (southwest, first base); Pope Street (northwest, third base); Bulwer Avenue (northeast, left field); Clarence Street (southeast, right field)
Currently: Industrial area

Athletic Park
Home of: St. Louis Giants – Negro Leagues (ca.1910–1913)
Location: North Garrison Ave (west); North Market Street (left); Glasgow Avenue (east); Magazine Street (south)
Currently: nursing home

Giants Park (II) renamed Metropolitan Park ca.1934
Home of:
St. Louis Giants – Negro National League (1920–1921 most games)
St. Louis Stars (II) – Negro American League (1937)
Location: North Broadway (southwest, first base); Clarence Street (northwest, third base); Prescott Avenue (northeast, left field); Holly Street (southeast, right field)
Currently: Industrial area

Stars Park
Home of: St. Louis Stars – Negro National League (mid-1922 to 1931)
Location: 130 South Compton Avenue (west); Laclede Avenue (north); North Market Street (south) – a few blocks east from Handlan's Park
Currently: Baseball field for Harris–Stowe State University

Busch Memorial Stadium
Home of: St. Louis Cardinals – NL (mid-1966 to 2005)
Location: 250 Stadium Plaza (west, third base); Spruce Street (south, first base); Walnut Street (north, left field); Broadway (east, right field)
Currently: Plaza area for the new ballpark

Busch Stadium (III)
Home of: St. Louis Cardinals – NL (2006–present)
Location: 700 Clark Street (north, left field); Broadway (east, right field); Interstate 64 (south, first base); Stadium Plaza / South 8th Street (west, third base); – immediately southwest of Busch Memorial Stadium site (overlapping in left/center field)

See also
Lists of baseball parks

Sources
Peter Filichia, Professional Baseball Franchises, Facts on File, 1993.
Phil Lowry, Green Cathedrals,  several editions.
Michael Benson, Ballparks of North America, McFarland, 1989.
Joan M. Thomas, St. Louis' Big League Ballparks, Arcadia, 2004.
Baseball Memories, by Marc Okkonen, Sterling Publishing, 1992.
The Federal League of 1914–1915, by Marc Okkonen, SABR, 1989.

External links
Sanborn map showing a Giants ballpark, 1908
Sanborn map showing Athletic Park, 1909
Info about St. Louis Giants
More info about St. Louis Giants
Still more info about St. Louis Giants
Kuebler's Park

St. Louis

Baseball parks